Ali Yar Kandi (also Romanized as ʿAlī Yār Kandī; also known as ‘Olīār Kandī) is a village in Baruq Rural District, Baruq District, Miandoab County, West Azerbaijan Province, Iran. At the 2006 census, its population was 338, in 74 families.

References 

Populated places in Miandoab County